Rolland Harty Spaulding (March 15, 1873 – March 14, 1942) was an American manufacturer and Republican politician. He was the 55th governor of New Hampshire from 1915 to 1917.

Early life and education
Rolland Harty Spaulding was the third son of Jonas Spaulding and Emeline Cummings. He was born in 1873 in Townsend Harbor, Massachusetts, where his father and uncle had a fiberboard mill.  His father founded a mill at Rochester, New Hampshire and moved his family there.  The young Spaulding was educated at Phillips Academy, class of 1893.

Career
With his two older brothers, Rolland Spaulding joined their father in the family business, renamed  J. Spaulding and Sons, which ran mills to produce leatherboard (typically produced by pulping and compressing scrap leather and wood pulp).  In addition to mills in Massachusetts and New Hampshire, that his father had founded, Rolland and his brothers Leon C. and Huntley N. Spaulding, built one in Tonawanda, New York, which became the largest.

Rolland Spaulding became a prominent businessman, working with his father and brothers in the family industry.  Their family-owned company manufactured fiberboard, later adding a type of resin laminate named Spauldite® (to compete with Bakelite) and fiberglass tubing to their product lines.

Spaulding became active in Republican Party state politics.  He was elected Governor in 1914, but declined to run for a second term.

Like his brothers and sister Marion, Rolland became a philanthropist.  He died the day before his 69th birthday, in Rochester, New Hampshire.

Honors 

 Spaulding Turnpike was named for Rolland and his brother Huntley N. Spaulding.  It connects their hometown of Rochester to I-95.

External links
Spaulding at New Hampshire's Division of Historic Resources

1873 births
1942 deaths
Republican Party governors of New Hampshire
People from Townsend, Massachusetts